Vihiers is a former commune in the Maine-et-Loire department in western France. On 1 January 2016, it was merged into the new commune of Lys-Haut-Layon.

Geography
Vihiers is around 30 km south of Angers, around 30 km northeast of Cholet, and around 80 km east of Nantes. Main road D960 skirts the village. Public transport is provided by the regional bus company Aléop (services to Angers, Cholet and Saumur) and the local bus company Choletbus.

History
In January 1974 the former communes of Saint-Hilaire-du-Bois and Le Voide were merged into the commune of Vihiers. At the creation of the commune nouvelle of Lys-Haut-Layon in 2016, the three former communes Vihiers, Saint-Hilaire-du-Bois and Le Voide became delegated communes.

Notable people
 Henry Nicollon des Abbayes (1898-1974), professor of botany who was an authority on lichens, and also undertook a noted study of the flora of Brittany, was born in Vihiers.

See also
Communes of the Maine-et-Loire department

References

External links

 vihiers.fr - official website for Vihiers (and associated communes St Hilaire-du-Bois and Le Voide)
 tourisme-vihiersois.com - Vihiersois-Haut Layon Tourism Office

Former communes of Maine-et-Loire
Anjou